Shady Grove is an unincorporated community in Greene County, Virginia, United States.

References
GNIS reference

Unincorporated communities in Greene County, Virginia
Unincorporated communities in Virginia